Jamaica competed at the 2004 Summer Paralympics in Athens, Greece. The team included 4 athletes, 2 men and 2 women. Competitors from Jamaica won 2 medals, including 1 gold, and 1 bronze to finish 53rd in the medal table.

Medalists

Athletics

Men's field

Women's field

See also
Jamaica at the Paralympics
Jamaica at the 2004 Summer Olympics

References 

Nations at the 2004 Summer Paralympics
2004
Summer Paralympics